Komprachcice  (Silesian: Kůmprachćicy, German: Comprachtschütz, Gumpertsdorf during Nazi Germany) is a village in Opole County, Opole Voivodeship, in south-western Poland. It is the seat of the gmina (administrative district) called Gmina Komprachcice.

The village has a population of 2,900.

Notable people 
Bascha Mika (born 1954) is a German journalist and publicist who was born in the town.

References

Villages in Opole County